Alexandru Stoica may refer to:

 Alexandru Iulian Stoica (1997–), Romanian footballer.
 Alexandru Ionuț Stoica (2000–), Romanian footballer.